Adil Titi (born 20 August 1999) is a Swedish footballer who plays for IK Brage as a midfielder.

References

External links 
 

1999 births
Living people
Swedish footballers
Swedish people of Ghanaian descent
Association football midfielders
IFK Göteborg players
Norrby IF players
IK Brage players
Allsvenskan players
Superettan players
Footballers from Gothenburg